Atlanta shooting or Atlanta massacre may refer to:

1906 Atlanta race riot
1999 Atlanta day trading firm shootings, a shooting spree at Atlanta-area trading day firms and houses that killed 12 people and injured 13 others in 1999
Killing of Rayshard Brooks, the fatal shooting of an African American man by Atlanta police in 2020
2021 Atlanta spa shootings, a shooting spree at three spas that killed 8 people, including six women of Asian descent and injured one other, in 2021

See also
Crime in Atlanta